Appointment may refer to:

Law 
The prerogative power of a government official or executive to select persons to fill an honorary position or employment in the government (political appointments, poets laureate)
Power of appointment, the legal ability of a testator to select another person to dispose of the testator's property
Recess appointment, a method of filling vacancies under U.S. federal law
Appointment, a form of Royal Warrant
List of positions filled by presidential appointment with Senate confirmation
Nomination and confirmation to the Supreme Court of the United States
Judicial appointments in Canada, made by the federal government or provincial government. Superior and federal court judges are appointed by federal government, while inferior courts are appointed by the provincial government
Warrant of Appointment, an official document presented by the President of Ireland to persons upon appointment to certain offices

Religion 
Papal appointment, the oldest method for the selection of the pope
Appointment of Catholic bishops, in the Catholic Church is a complicated process
Appointment of Church of England bishops, follows a somewhat convoluted process, reflecting the church's traditional tendency towards compromise and ad hoc solutions, traditional ambiguity between hierarchy and democracy, and traditional role as a semi-autonomous state church. (Suffragan bishops are appointed through a much simpler process, reflecting their status as directly responsible to their diocesan bishop.)
Letter of appointment, in Church of Jesus Christ of Latter-day Saints history

Others 
Appointment to the Order of Canada, the process by which Canadians citizens or certain foreign persons are inducted into the Order of Canada, an act that is Canada's second highest civilian honour within the country's system of honours
Court appointment, one of the traditional positions within a royal, ducal, or noble household
The Appointment, a 1969 psychological drama
The Appointment (novel), published in German in 1997 and in English in 2001
Appointment, a means of funding postdoctoral research
A time designated for a meeting with a professional on a schedule